Jack Corstiaan van Poortvliet (born 15 May 2001) is an English rugby union scrum half for Leicester Tigers in Premiership Rugby.

Career
Van Poortvliet was born in Colby, Norfolk and began playing rugby for North Walsham R.F.C., at 12 years old he joined Leicester Tigers academy pathway and at 13 joined Oakham School to progress his rugby. Originally a fly half he switched position inside to scrum half and played as Leicester won the Under 18s academy league in the 2017-18 and 2018–19 seasons.

Following the success of the academy side, in July 2019, van Poortvliet was one of 11 players offered professional terms to join the club's development squad. He made his first team debut for Leicester on 21 September 2019 in a Premiership Rugby Cup match against Worcester Warriors at Sixways.

On 3 January 2020, van Poortvliet was named in the England under 20 squad for the 2020 Six Nations Championship. And he featured in first two matches against France and Scotland.

On 21 February 2020, van Poortvliet made his full Premiership debut in a 36–3 defeat to Sale Sharks at the AJ Bell Stadium in Salford. Van Poortvliet's kick was charged down for Sale's first try. He scored his first try for Leicester against Harlequins on 13 February 2021, which won the "try of the week" award for that round of the Premiership Rugby season. He scored against Exeter Chiefs where he darted off the back of a maul, sidestepping Olly Woodburn and diving over the try–line to score.

On 30 October 2021, van Poortvliet scored two tries after appearing as a substitute in the East Midlands Derby against Northampton Saints. He captained Leicester for the first time on 13 November 2021, in a 32-23 Premiership Rugby Cup win against Sale Sharks.

In June 2022 van Poortvliet received his first call-up to the senior England squad by coach Eddie Jones.

On 28 September 2022 van Poortvliet extended his contract at Leicester.

International tries 
As of 6 November 2022

Family
Van Poortvliet comes from a farming family. His great-grandfather moved to Norfolk from the Netherlands prior to World War I and bought a farm there. His family is part Scottish on his mother's side. His father played for Saracens F.C. in the 1990s.

References

External links

2001 births
Living people
English rugby union players
Leicester Tigers players
People educated at Oakham School
Rugby union players from Norwich
Rugby union scrum-halves
England international rugby union players